Hamaspora is a genus of rust fungi in the family Phragmidiaceae. The genus contains 14 species, which are known from Africa, Asia, and Australia.

Species
Hamaspora acutissima
Hamaspora australis
Hamaspora dobremezii
Hamaspora engleriana
Hamaspora gedeana
Hamaspora hashiokai
Hamaspora longissima
Hamaspora nepalensis
Hamaspora okinawensis
Hamaspora ozeensis
Hamaspora rubi-sieboldii
Hamaspora sinica
Hamaspora taiwaniana
Hamaspora viennotii

References

External links

Pucciniales
Taxa named by Friedrich August Körnicke